The Leeds municipal elections were held on 12 May 1960, with one third of the council set to be re-elected.

A large swing of 5.5% to the Conservatives allowed them their first election victory since 1951 - having won the most votes in several elections since then, but never amounting to a majority of seats. The Conservatives made their six gains from Labour in the wards of Beeston, Bramley, Harehills, Stanningley, Westfield, Woodhouse and Wortley, halving Labour's majority of councillors from 24 to 12.

Elsewhere, the Liberals managed a post-war first of beating Labour to second place in Allerton and Far Headingley, and the first Independent candidate standing since the war, Dennis Peddar, made negligible impact in Westfield. Turnout fell sharply for this election - by nearly a quarter from the previous year - to a new low of 27.5%.

Election result

The result had the following consequences for the total number of seats on the council after the elections:

Ward results

References

Leeds
Leeds City Council elections
1960s in Leeds